Cathorops manglarensis is a species of catfish in the family Ariidae. It was described by Alexandre Pires Marceniuk in 2007. It is a tropical, fresh and saltwater catfish which occurs in Colombia.

The species epithet "manglarensis" refers to the preferred habitat of the species, in mangroves.

References

Ariidae
Fish described in 2007